"Kingdom Come" is a song performed by Australian Christian pop singer Rebecca St. James featuring Australian Christian pop duo For King & Country. The song was released on 22 October 2021, as the lead single to her tenth studio album, also titled Kingdom Come (2022). St. James co-wrote the song with Joel Smallbone, Luke Smallbone, and Seth Mosley. Tedd Tjornhom and Seth Mosley handled the production of the single.

"Kingdom Come" peaked at No. 34 on the US Hot Christian Songs chart.

Background
On 21 October 2021, Rebecca St. James announced that she would be releasing "Kingdom Come" as her next single, featuring For King & Country, on 22 October 2021. The single was released the following day, with St. James also announcing that it is the lead single to her tenth studio album of the same name, slated for release on 18 February 2022. St. James shared the story behind the song, saying:

Composition

Accolades

Commercial performance
In the United States, "Kingdom Come" made its debut at number eight on Billboard's Christian Digital Song Sales chart dated 6 November 2021. It later peaked at number twenty-six on Billboard's Christian Airplay chart and number thirty-four on the Hot Christian Songs chart.

Music video
The official music video of "Kingdom Come" premiered on Rebecca St. James' YouTube channel on 19 November 2021.

Charts

Release history

References

External links
 

2021 songs
2021 singles
Contemporary Christian songs
Rebecca St. James songs
For King & Country (band) songs
Songs written by Rebecca St. James
Songs written by Seth Mosley
Songs written by Joel Smallbone